Révész is a Hungarian surname. Notable people with the surname include:

 András Révész 
 Géza Révész
 György Révész 
 Judith Révész (1915–2018), Hungarian-Dutch potter and sculptor
 Julianna Révész (born 1983), Hungarian fencer
 Máriusz Révész (born 1967), Hungarian politician
 Tamás Révész, Hungarian-American photographer
 Richard Revesz (born 1958), American lawyer

Hungarian-language surnames